Românești is a commune in Botoșani County, Western Moldavia, Romania. It is composed of four villages: Dămideni, Românești, Românești-Vale and Sărata.

References

Communes in Botoșani County
Localities in Western Moldavia
Populated places on the Prut